Imaginary Friend is a psychological horror novel by American author Stephen Chbosky. It was published on October 1, 2019 by Grand Central Publishing and was an instant New York Times Best Seller. It is Chbosky's long-awaited follow-up to the 1999 international best-seller The Perks of Being a Wallflower.

Plot

Single mother Kate Reese and her son, Christopher, flee an abusive relationship in the middle of the night. Together, they find themselves drawn to the tight-knit community of Mill Grove, Pennsylvania.

Initially, Mill Grove seems like the perfect place to settle down. Then Christopher vanishes for six days, until he emerges from the woods at the edge of town, unharmed but not unchanged. He returns with a voice in his head only he can hear and a resolve to build a treehouse in the woods by Christmas...

Critical reception
A departure from his debut novel, Imaginary Friend was very well-received and debuted as a New York Times Best Seller. The review from Time stated it evoked "echoes of Stephen King" and "well worth the time for those who dare," with additional positive reviews from The New York Times, the Kirkus Review, the Washington Post, NPR and numerous others, as well as being named one of Varietys Top 10 books of 2019.

References

2019 American novels
Novels by Stephen Chbosky
Grand Central Publishing books
Novels set in Pennsylvania
American horror novels